Kromnów may refer to the following places in Poland:
Kromnów, Lower Silesian Voivodeship (south-west Poland)
Kromnów, Masovian Voivodeship (east-central Poland)